Creative Juice is a crafting television show hosted by Cathie Filian and Steve Piacenza on HGTV and DIY Network. The program features art projects, home decorating ideas, and cooking. Filian and Piacenza were nominated for a Daytime Emmy in the Best Lifestyle Host category in 2006. The program spawned a Halloween-themed spinoff called Witch Crafts in 2007.

Season 1

Season 2

Season 3

Season 4

Season 5

Season 6

Season 7

Season 8

Witch Crafts

References

HGTV original programming
2006 American television series debuts